Northmount is a neighbourhood in northwest Edmonton, Alberta, Canada. It and the Evansdale neighbourhood to the north comprise Edmonton's Dickinsfield community.

Northmount is bounded by the Griesbach neighbourhood across 97 Street to the west, the Evansdale neighbourhood across 144 Avenue to the north, the Kildare neighbourhood across 82 Street to the east, and the Glengarry neighbourhood across 137 Avenue to the south.

The community is represented by the Northmount Community League, established in 1971, which maintains a community hall and outdoor rink located at 92 Street and 140 Avenue.

Demographics 

Housing 
In 2005, Northmount's housing breakdown consisted of 69% single-family dwellings, 21% row houses, 7% rooming houses, and 2% low-rise apartments (fewer than five storeys).

Schools 
There are three schools in Northmount including Dickinsfield Junior High School and Northmount Elementary School operated by Edmonton Public Schools and St. Anne Catholic Elementary School operated by Edmonton Catholic Schools.

Shopping 
North Town Centre is located at the southwest corner of Northmount. Northgate Centre is located across 137 Avenue from North Town Centre to the south in Glengarry.

Health care 
The Dickinsfield Extended Care Hospital is located in the Northmount.

Northgate Transit Centre 

The Northgate Transit Centre, opened on January 16, 1987, is located on the north side of 137 Avenue on 97 Street in front of North Town Centre across from Northgate Centre. This transit centre has public washrooms, a convenience store, a large shelter and a pay phone. There is no park & ride, drop off area, or vending machines at this transit centre.

The original 1986 transit centre shelter was replaced in 2013. The new shelter, built as a part of $4.575 million in upgrades to the transit centre that year, won an "award of merit" from the Prairie Design Awards in 2014 partly for the use of brightly coloured panels on the building facade.

The following bus routes serve the transit centre:

Surrounding neighbourhoods

See also 
 Edmonton Federation of Community Leagues
 Edmonton Transit System

References 

Neighbourhoods in Edmonton
Edmonton Transit Service transit centres